Remicourt is the name of several places:

Belgium

 Remicourt, Belgium, a municipality in the province of Liège, Wallonia

France

Remicourt is the name of several communes in France:
 Remicourt, Marne, in the Marne département
 Remicourt, Vosges, in the Vosges département